Morgane Tschiember is a French artist. She was born in Brest, France in 1976 and currently lives and works in Paris, France.

Biography 
She graduated from DNSAP from ENSBA in Paris (National School of Fine Arts) in 2002 and DNSEP (National School of Artistic Expression) in Quimper in 1999.

The winner of the Espace Paul Ricard Prize in 2001, occasionally working with Olivier Mosset, Morgane Tschiember has participated in over 60 solo and group shows throughout the world (France, Austria, Belgium, Britain, Czech Republic, Germany, Italy, Serbia, Japan,  Switzerland and the United States).

Work 
Morgane Tschiember has directed her work from two- to three-dimensional pieces, in order to explore the transitions between dimensions, and how they relate to each other. Thus her sculptures are sometimes colorful, in order to make color a pure original material to be shaped, and therefore open a connection between painting and sculpture.

Sculpting can also be a way to investigate the relationship between the objects and the places, always trying to have as a result that both are revealed and emphasized so the spectator gets a more complete esthetic experience.

She considers herself as "classic" in the sense that she works on fundamental elements such as form, color, material... that are universals and run through all of art history. But she also explores, in a very personal and innovative way the new possibilities of painting and making sculptures, revealing her interest in how the meaning "shifts" (not only in how one considers what one is looking at, but because reality can not reside in one single interpretation).

As a result, her sculptures try to not only stand in three dimensions, but include others such as time, action, movement, flux or fluids, opening up the place a piece takes and how it relates to where it stands.

Solo exhibitions (selection) 
2010
Morgane Tschiember, Fondation d'entreprise Ricard, Paris, France
Morgane Tschiember, Gallery Loevenbruck, Paris, France
Solid Geometry, Super Window Project, Art Fair Tokyo, Tokyo, Japan
Folding Space, Super Window Project, Kyoto, Japan
The Shortest Way to Sleepness, Audio Visual Arts, New York, USA
2009
Morgane Tschiember, Gallery Lange & Pult, Zurich, Switzerland
The Sound of Paradise, Gallery Sollertis, Toulouse, France
2007
Iron Maiden, Galerie Loevenbruck, Paris, France
Running Bond, Galerie French Made, Munich, Germany
Dohromady, Project Room, Galerie Monika Burian, Prague, Czechoslovakia
2005
Project Room, Catherine Bastide Gallery, Brussels, Belgium
Melanie Korn Gallery, Munich, Germany
One Man Show, Art Dealers Marseille, Vanessa Quang Gallery, SEAD Galerie, Antwerp, Belgium
2004
French Made Gallery, Munich, Germany
2003
Chair(s) Project, in 10 butcher shops, France
2002
Paul Ricard, Espace Paul Ricard, Paris, France
Blasons, 4 x 3 Billsticking, Paris, France

References

External links
Morgane Tschiember
Galerie Loevenbruck, Paris, France
Audio Visual Arts, New York, USA
Super Window Project, Kyoto, Japan
Galerie Une, Neuchâtel, Switzerland
Lange & Pult Gallery, Zurich, Switzerland
Galerie Sollertis, Toulouse, France
Zoo Galerie, Nantes, France
Fondation d'Entreprise Paul Ricard, Paris, France
Edition 5, Erstfeld, Switzerland
Éric Seydoux Editions, Nantes, France
M19, Paris, France
ZéroDeux, Nantes, France

French artists
1976 births
Living people